Sadleria cyatheoides, commonly known as amaumau fern or amau, is a fern species in the family Blechnaceae, in the eupolypods II clade of the order Polypodiales, in the class Polypodiopsida. Kīlauea's Halemaʻumaʻu is named for this species.

Description 
The young fronds are often tinged red to block harmful rays from the sun.

References

External links
Sadleria cyatheoides. NatureServe. 2012.

Blechnaceae
Endemic flora of Hawaii
Native ferns of Hawaii
Plants described in 1824